was an intermittent and short-lived feudal domain in Edo period Japan, located in Mutsu Province, in Yanagawa, now the city of Date, Fukushima Prefecture.

History
The domain was created in Tenna 3 (1683), with Matsudaira Yoshimasa, third son of Tokugawa Mitsutomo, its first daimyō. After third lord Matsudaira Yoshizane died in 1727 without heir, the domain briefly lapsed, but four months later was renewed under Matsudaira Michiharu, seventh son of Tokugawa Tsunanari, before being abolished the following year, the territory reverting to the bakufu. Eighty years later, in 1807, Matsumae Akihiro was transferred from Ezo-chi to the recreated domain, where the clan was based until his return to Matsumae in 1821, at which point the domain was once again abolished, this time for good, the territory reverting once more to the bakufu.

List of daimyō
 Matsudaira clan 1683–1728

  Matsumae clan 1807–1821

References

Domains of Japan
Mutsu Province
History of Fukushima Prefecture
Date, Fukushima
Matsumae clan